Bishop Conaty-Our Lady of Loretto High School is a Catholic, archdiocesan, all-female high school located in the Harvard Heights neighborhood of Los Angeles, California. It is located in the Roman Catholic Archdiocese of Los Angeles.

History 
John Joseph Cantwell founded Los Angeles Catholic Girls’ High School in 1923. The faculty was composed of nuns from six Religious Orders:  Sisters of the Immaculate Heart of Mary, Sisters of St. Joseph of Carondelet, Sisters of Mercy, Sisters of the Holy Cross, Sisters of the Presentation of Mary and Sisters of Loretto. This collaboration combined the strength of many teaching sisterhoods and maintained Catholic education at its highest standard.  The Sisters of Charity of the Blessed Virgin Mary (BVMs) from Dubuque, Iowa, served at the school from 1940 to 1965. The school was dedicated in memory of Thomas James Conaty in recognition of his zeal for Catholic education.  The school was renamed Bishop Conaty Memorial High School in 1955.

Our Lady of Loretto High School was opened in September, 1949 during the episcopate of James Francis McIntyre.  Cardinal McIntyre had just begun a building campaign for Catholic high schools throughout the Archdiocese. Our Lady of Loretto was the first school to be opened during this campaign. During its forty-year history, the school offered a curriculum of studies that challenged young women to meet their educational goals and to reach their fullest potential.

Changing community and times necessitated merging two schools to enable the Archdiocese to preserve the mission it began in 1923. In July, 1994 the school was officially named Bishop Conaty – Our Lady of Loretto High School. Over the years, the strengths, Christian mission and traditions developed, preparing young women for their roles in the world.

Location 
The school is located in the Harvard Heights, Los Angeles neighborhood at 2900 West Pico Blvd., Los Angeles, California.

The school is within walking distance from Loyola High School, a Jesuit all-boys Catholic High School.

Athletics 
Basketball:  Horizon League Champions 2001, 2002, 2005, 2006, 2007, 2008, 2012, 2013, 2014, 2015, 2016, 2017, 2019;  CIF Southern Section Division Finalist 2007, 2019

Volleyball:  Horizon League Champions 2001, 2002, 2003, 2004, 2006, 2014, 2015, 2017; CIF Southern Section Division Finalist 2008, 2013

Soccer:  Horizon League Champions 2012, 2014

Cheer: Cheer at the basketball games and stuff

Notable Alumnae 

 Frances (Corita) Kent, class of 1936, educator, artist
 Sr. Callista Roy, class of 1957, nurse theorist
 Pilar Seurat (Rita Hernandez), class of 1957, actress
 Marilyn White, class of 1962, Olympian
 Adrienne Fuzee, class of 1968, artist, curator
 Maria Elena Salinas, class of 1973, journalist

Notes and references

External links
 Bishop Conaty-Our Lady of Loretto High School Official Website
 WCEA Western Catholic Educational Association

Girls' schools in California
High schools in Los Angeles
Roman Catholic secondary schools in Los Angeles County, California
Educational institutions established in 1923
Harvard Heights, Los Angeles
Catholic secondary schools in California
1923 establishments in California